Lisa Joy Allpress  (née Mumby; born 1974 or 1975) is a New Zealand jockey. She was the first female jockey in New Zealand to reach 1000 wins.

Allpress was born in 1974 or 1975. She was apprenticed to trainer Kevin Gray at Waverley. Her first race ride was on Miss Molly in a maiden at Matamata on 23 October 2002. She recorded her first win the next day on Rosafe at Wanganui. Her first Group Win was on We Can Say It Now in the Captain Cook Stakes at Trentham on 4 December 2010. , Allpress has also ridden successfully in Singapore (57), Japan (7 wins) and Malaysia (12). Her win in Saudi Arabia was the first by a female jockey.

She won her first New Zealand jockey premiership in 2012, achieving the same result again in 2016, 2019 and 2020. In 2013, she became the first female jockey in New Zealand to reach 1000 wins. As of 2 March 2022, she had ridden 1744 winners.

In the 2021 New Year Honours, Allpress was appointed an Officer of the New Zealand Order of Merit, for services to the racing industry.

Personal 
Allpress married racehorse trainer Karl Allpress in 2002, and they live on a farm at Whanganui with their two sons.

References 

1970s births
Living people
New Zealand jockeys
Officers of the New Zealand Order of Merit
Female jockeys